South Gibson may refer to:

South Gibson, Pennsylvania
South Gibson County High School
South Gibson School Corporation